Hina Pervaiz Butt (born 19 January 1982) is a Pakistani politician  and a PML-N's member in Provincial Assembly of the Punjab on reserved seats for women.

Early life and education
Butt was born on 19 January 1982 in Lahore.

She received her initial education from Convent of Jesus and Mary, Lahore. She earned the degrees of Bachelor of Science (Hons) in 2004 and received the degree of Master of Business Administration in 2010 from Lahore University of Management Sciences.

In 2016, she earned a Master of Arts in International Relations from Middlesex University campus in Dubai.

Political career
She was elected to the Provincial Assembly of the Punjab as a candidate of Pakistan Muslim League (N) (PML-N) on a reserved seat for women in 2013 Pakistani general election.

She was selected to the Provincial Assembly of the Punjab as a candidate of PML-N between on a reserved seat for women based on friendly links with the PML-N leadership in 2018 Pakistani general election.

References

Living people
Punjab MPAs 2013–2018
Women members of the Provincial Assembly of the Punjab
1982 births
Pakistan Muslim League (N) MPAs (Punjab)
Convent of Jesus and Mary, Lahore alumni
Lahore University of Management Sciences alumni
Pakistani people of Kashmiri descent
21st-century Pakistani women politicians